Sam Stone (born 4 August 1997) is a Malta international rugby league footballer who plays as a  forward for the Salford Red Devils in the Betfred Super League. 

He previously played for the Newcastle Knights and Gold Coast Titans in the NRL.

Background
Stone was born on the Gold Coast, Queensland, Australia and is of Maltese descent. He moved to Newcastle, New South Wales at a young age.

He played his junior rugby league for the Valentine-Eleebana Red Devils and Lakes United, before being signed by the Newcastle Knights.

Stone is the son of former Huddersfield Giants and Newcastle coach Rick Stone.

Playing career

Early career
In 2015 and 2016, Stone played for the Newcastle Knights' NYC team.

2017
In round 1 of the 2017 NRL season, Stone made his NRL debut for the Knights against the New Zealand Warriors. In May, he played for the Junior Kangaroos against the Junior Kiwis. He finished his debut season with 16 NRL matches and two tries. In September, he had his Knights contract extended until the end of 2018.

2018
Stone only appeared in two NRL matches for the Knights in 2018. Late in the year, he played for Malta in the 2018 Emerging Nations World Championship.

2019
After round 14, Stone moved to the Gold Coast Titans mid-season on a contract until the end of 2020, after failing to make an NRL appearance for the Knights so far that season.
Stone made eight appearances for the Gold Coast in 2019 as the club finished last on the table.

2020
Stone played nine games for the Gold Coast in the 2020 NRL season as the club finished ninth on the table and missed the finals.

2021
On 2 August 2021, it was reported that he had signed for Leigh in the Super League.

References

External links
Gold Coast Titans profile
Newcastle Knights profile

1997 births
Living people
Australian people of Maltese descent
Australian expatriate sportspeople in England
Australian rugby league players
Gold Coast Titans players
Junior Kangaroos players
Lakes United Seagulls players
Leigh Leopards players
Malta national rugby league team players
Newcastle Knights players
Rugby league players from Gold Coast, Queensland
Rugby league second-rows
Salford Red Devils players
Valentine-Eleebana Red Devils players